Auckland Adventist Hospital was an Adventist Hospital in Auckland. It was a private sector hospital, and was located in Saint Heliers. It provided a very wide range of services.

The hospital's medical center included accident, laboratory, physiotherapy and radiology services, a pharmacy and specialist consulting rooms. It was sold by the Trans-Tasman Union Conference due to financial difficulties.

The hospital's capacity varied between six and 67 at different times.

See also

 List of Seventh-day Adventist hospitals

References

External links
Article from Adventist News Network
[https://web.archive.org/web/20080722212406/http://www.adventist.org.au/personnel/edir.nsf/vwDisplay/D5B0DC7F84D7DE05CA2565D800135BE3?OpenDocument 
Hospital buildings completed in 1976
Defunct hospitals in New ZealandAdventist Directory]

Buildings and structures in Auckland
Hospitals affiliated with the Seventh-day Adventist Church
Hospitals established in 1976
Hospitals disestablished in 1999
1999 disestablishments in New Zealand
1976 establishments in New Zealand
Former Seventh-day Adventist institutions